Sam (Samuel) Dickinson (born 11 July 1997) is an English international triathlete. He has represented England at the Commonwealth Games, where he won a gold medal.

Biography
Dickinson won a silver medal as part of the British team that won the mixed relay at the 2022 World Triathlon Mixed Relay Championships in Montreal.

In 2022, he was selected for the 2022 Commonwealth Games in Birmingham where he competed in men's event, finishing in 19th place. However as part of the mixed relay team he won a gold medal in the mixed relay event, where he was joined by Alex Yee, Sophie Caldwell and Georgia Taylor-Brown in the winning team.

References

1997 births
Living people
English male triathletes
British male triathletes
Triathletes at the 2022 Commonwealth Games
Commonwealth Games competitors for England
Commonwealth Games gold medallists for England
Commonwealth Games medallists in triathlon
Sportspeople from York
Medallists at the 2022 Commonwealth Games